Curt "Kirkee B." Bisquera is an American drummer known for his extensive work as a touring and session musician.

Biography
Bisquera has worked with Johnny Cash, Josh Groban, Mick Jagger, Seal, Sarah McLachlan, Elton John, Johnny Hallyday and Tom Petty and the Heartbreakers, among others. He has stated that his greatest accomplishment was performing in Madison Square Garden with Elton John. He is endorsed by Drum Workshop drums, Paiste cymbals, Remo heads, and Vater drumsticks.

In 2012, Bisquera made an appearance on The Beach Boys' reunion album, That's Why God Made the Radio.

Collaborations 
With Josh Groban
 Josh Groban (143 Records, 2001)
 All That Echoes (Reprise Records, 2013)

With Terence Trent D'Arby
 Symphony or Damn (Columbia Records, 1993)

With Julieta Venegas
 Aquí (RCA International, 1997)
 Bueninvento (RCA International, 2000)

With Mick Jagger
 Wandering Spirit (Atlantic Records, 1993)

With Shelby Lynne
 Just a Little Lovin' (Lost Highway Records, 2008)

With Ronan Keating
 Fires (Polydor Records, 2012)

With Taylor Dayne
 Naked Without You (Neptune, 1998)
 Satisfied (Adrenaline, 2008)

With Céline Dion
 Falling into You (Columbia Records, 1996)

With Paula Abdul
 Spellbound (Virgin Records, 1991)

With Chris Isaak
 Speak of the Devil (Reprise Records, 1998)

With Melanie C
 Reason (Virgin Records, 2003)

With Beth Hart
 Bang Bang Boom Boom (Provogue Records, 2012)

With Elton John
 Duets (MCA, 1993)

With Bonnie Raitt
 Luck of the Draw (Capitol Records, 1991)

With Tony Joe White
 Lake Placid Blues (Polydor Records, 1995)

With Lulu
 Together (Mercury Records, 2002)

With Mike Love
 Unleash the Love (BMG, 2017)

With Nelly Furtado
 Whoa, Nelly! (Warner Bros. Records, 2000)

With Boz Scaggs
 Fade into Light (BVMP, 1996)

External links

Curt's official webpage

1964 births
Living people
People from Santa Maria, California
Musicians from Arizona
Musicians Institute alumni
20th-century American drummers
American male drummers
20th-century American male musicians